Sebastián Caicedo (Born as Juan Sebastián Caicedo Londoño on November 12, 1980 in  Cali, Colombia), is a Colombian television actor. He has participated in several telenovelas which also featured his ex-wife, Carmen Villalobos.

On 2017 he won a Nickelodeon Kids' Choice Awards blimp on the Trendy Guy category

Filmography

References

External links 

1981 births
Male actors from Cali
21st-century Colombian male actors
Colombian male telenovela actors
Living people